Felix Blohberger (born August 20, 2002, Vienna, Austria) is an Austrian Chess Champion. He obtained FIDE Master title in 2016 and International Master title in 2018.FIDE awarded him the chess Grandmaster title in 2022.

Notable Tournaments

References 

2002 births
Living people
Chess grandmasters
Game players from Vienna
Austrian chess players
Austrian sportspeople